Mkulumuzi River is a river of Tanzania. It is part of the Pangani River basin.

References

Rivers of Tanzania